Iqbal Survé is a South African medical doctor, philanthropist and entrepreneur. He is the Chairman of the Sekunjalo Investments, and Executive Chairman of Independent Media, one of South Africa's largest media companies.

Several banks, including Absa, FNB, Nedbank, Investec, and Mercantile Bank refuse to do business with any company tied to Survé and his Sekunjalo Investment Holdings. 28 more banks and representative offices of foreign banks are boycotting Survé and his companies. The biggest South African banks cited the Mpati Commission findings of the "malfeasance" of Survé's group.

Early life

Iqbal Survé was born on 12 February 1963 in Cape Town, South Africa. Survé has two sisters and is the middle child. He grew up in the Cape Town suburb of Kenilworth. The Survé family were one of the last families of colour to be forced to leave Kenilworth under the apartheid government's Group Areas Act. Kenilworth was originally a racially diverse neighbourhood, following the implementation of the apartheid government's Group Areas Act, it became exclusively white. The Survé family were never forcibly removed out of Kenilworth like in other areas of Cape Town such as District Six, however the Group Areas Act made it impossible for the Survé family to renovate the two bedroomed house behind the small family owned café. This property was built around 1890, the shower had a cold cement floor and only cold water. However, the family could not make changes because the Group Areas Act regulations would not provide them with the permission. The Group Areas Act inspectors would regularly terrorise the family and would often remove goods from the café. The technical loophole in the Group Areas Act was that, if you had a café, and the café and the house were combined, it made it difficult for them to forcibly remove you. If you only had a house, you would be easily removed. The majority of residents in Kenilworth were of mixed descent (during apartheid they were classified as coloured, Cape Malay or Cape coloured), all of these residents were forcibly removed except for café owners. The Group Areas Act authorities tried to force the Survé family to take a house with a café in Gatesville or Rylands, where they had built small council houses for people of Indian descent. Survé's father refused. Eventually, in 1985 Survé's father put the house on auction and the family moved to Lansdowne, a coloured designated area in Cape Town.

Education
Survé attended Livingstone High School, which was a coloured public school under apartheid. It was known to be extremely political, and teachers and staff including the deputy principal were part of the Trotskyist New Unity Movement. Survé was active in the anti-apartheid Lansdowne Youth Movement.

Survé began his studies in medicine at the University of Cape Town in 1982. He graduated with an MBChB in 1987. In 1992 Survé enrolled at the University of Cape Town for his honours degree in Sports science. In 1993, Survé was accepted to complete a fellowship with the American College of Sports Medicine which he completed in 1995.

In the early 2000s Survé spent time at Harvard Business School and completed a Senior Management Program in 2 years. In 2002 Survé completed a Masters of Business Administration (MBA) at the University of Cape Town Graduate School of Business.

Relationship with Nelson Mandela
Survé claims a close relationship with Nelson Mandela, and in 2014, a Leadership Platform article in Business Report (a paper owned by Survé's Sekunjalo group) stated that Survé had been Mandela's doctor "on and off Robben Island". These claims have been disputed on various grounds, such as Survé only having graduated after Mandela left Robben Island in 1982.

Sekunjalo Investments

Survé left medicine in 1997 to found Sekunjalo Investments, with the aim of investing and assisting Black-owned businesses, and in 1999 listed it on the Johannesburg Stock Exchange.  In 2013, Sekunjalo purchased a 55% stake in Independent News & Media SA, South Africa's second biggest newspaper group, from its international parent company, Independent News & Media. The purchase was largely funded by a loan from the government-owned Public Investment Corporation which manages the Government Employees Pension Fund. By 2018 a large proportion of the Public Investment Corporation's investment in Sekunjalo was reportedly written off while Sekunjalo claimed that they had reached an amicable agreement with the PIC for a debt-for-shares swop.

References

1963 births
Living people
South African business executives
University of Cape Town alumni
South African general practitioners
South African people of Indian descent